Gregory William Gordon (born October 4, 1960) is an American prelate of the Roman Catholic Church who has been serving as auxiliary bishop for the Diocese of Las Vegas since 2021.

Biography

Early life and education 
Gregory Gordon was born on October 4, 1960 in Philadelphia, Pennsylvania.  In 1972, when he was age 11, the family moved to Boulder City, Nevada. In 1978, Gordon entered St. Joseph’s University, then moved to St. Charles Borromeo Seminary Wynnewood, Pennsylvania, studying there until 1983.  While in Philadelphia, Gordon saw Pope John II in his 1978 visit to that city; it solidified his intentions to become a priest.

Gordon continued his studies in Rome, living at the North American College and entering the Pontifical Gregorian University.  He was awarded a Bachelor of Sacred Theology degree in 1986. In 1987, he received a Licentiate of Sacred Theology from the Pontifical Lateran University.

Priesthood 
Gordon was ordained to the priesthood by Bishop Daniel Walsh on January 16, 1988 for the Diocese of Reno-Las Vegas.After his ordination, Gordon was assigned as parochial vicar at St. Francis de Sales Parish in Las Vegas.  He was moved in 1990 to a position as associate pastor and then administrator at St. Anne Parish in Las Vegas.

In 1992, Gordon left St. Anne to serve in the campus ministry at the University of Nevada, Las Vegas while also assuming the role as pastor pro tempore at St. Mary the Virgin Parish.  In 1993, he was moved to Our Lady of Las Vegas Parish, where served as associate pastor.  Gordon was relocated again in 1994 to become administrator and then pastoral administrator of St. Christopher parish in North Las Vegas, where he would remain for the next eight years. On March 21, 1995, Gordon was incardinated into the new Diocese of Las Vegas when it was split from the Diocese of Reno by John Paul II. In 2004, Gordon was named pastor at St. Francis of Assisi Parish in Henderson, Nevada. 

In 2007, Gordon moved to Washington DC, where he was assigned to the Apostolic Nunciature. He served as secretary to the apostolic nuncio, first Archbishop Pietro Sambi and later Archbishop Carlo Viganò. On May 21, 2009, Gordon was named a chaplain of his holiness by Pope Benedict XVI, which granted him the title of monsignor. 

Gordon returned to Las Vegas in 2014, where he was appointed pastor at St. Anne Parish  In 2020, he was named chancellor, moderator of the curia, and vicar general for the diocese.

Auxiliary Bishop of Las Vegas 
On May 28, 2021, Gordon was named as the first auxiliary bishop of the Diocese of Las Vegas and the titular bishop of Nova Petra by Pope Francis. He received his episcopal consecration on July 16, 2021, from Bishop George Thomas, with Bishops Joseph A. Pepe and Daniel F. Walsh, serving as co-consecrators. 

In August 2021, Gordon stated that the Diocese of Las Vegas would not issue religious exemptions to parishioners to avoid taking the COVID-19 vaccine.

See also

 Catholic Church hierarchy
 Catholic Church in the United States
 Historical list of the Catholic bishops of the United States
 List of Catholic bishops of the United States
 Lists of patriarchs, archbishops, and bishops

References

External links
Roman Catholic Diocese of Las Vegas Official Site

Episcopal succession

 

1960 births
Living people
American Roman Catholic bishops by contiguous area of the United States
Bishops appointed by Pope Francis
Clergy from Philadelphia
People from Boulder City, Nevada
Saint Joseph's University alumni
St. Charles Borromeo Seminary alumni
Pontifical Gregorian University alumni
Pontifical Lateran University alumni